Kang Myong-a (born 30 March 1972) is a South Korean sport shooter. She competed in rifle shooting events at the 1992 Summer Olympics.

Olympic results

References

1972 births
Living people
South Korean female sport shooters
ISSF rifle shooters
Olympic shooters of South Korea
Shooters at the 1992 Summer Olympics
Shooters at the 1990 Asian Games
Asian Games medalists in shooting
Asian Games bronze medalists for South Korea
Medalists at the 1990 Asian Games
20th-century South Korean women
21st-century South Korean women